The  is a constituency that represents Akita Prefecture in the House of Councillors in the Diet of Japan. Councillors are elected to the house by single non-transferable vote (SNTV) for six-year terms. Since the establishment of the current House of Councillors electoral system in 1947, the district has elected two Councillors, one each at elections held every three years. It has 888,496 registered voters as of September 2015.

The Councillors currently representing Akita are:
 Hiroo Ishii (Liberal Democratic Party (LDP)); a former professional baseball in the Nippon Professional Baseball leagues, was elected to his first term in 2010, re-elected in 2016 and his current term will end in 2022.
 Shizuka Terata (Independent); elected to her first term in 2019, which will end in 2025.

Elected Councillors

Election results

References 

Districts of the House of Councillors (Japan)